Enrique Camarena (born 11 June 1938) is a Spanish sports shooter. He competed at the 1976 Summer Olympics and the 1980 Summer Olympics.

References

External links
 

1938 births
Living people
Spanish male sport shooters
Olympic shooters of Spain
Shooters at the 1976 Summer Olympics
Shooters at the 1980 Summer Olympics
Place of birth missing (living people)
20th-century Spanish people